The Dongjiang Dam is an arch dam on the Lishui River  southwest of Zixing in Hunan Province, China. The dam was constructed between 1978 and 1992 and supports a 500 MW hydroelectric power station. The dam also provides for flood control, navigation and water supply. The dam's first generator was operational in 1987 and the reservoir, Dongjiang Lake, forced the relocation of 5.2 million people.

Design
The dam's power station lies at its base and contains four 125 MW Francis turbine-generators. The dam is also equipped with a boat/lumber lift.

See also

List of tallest dams in the world

References

Dams in China
Hydroelectric power stations in Hunan
Arch dams
Dams completed in 1992
Energy infrastructure completed in 1992
1992 establishments in China
Chenzhou